The 2018-19 Kategoria e Dytë was the 47th official season of the Albanian football third division since its establishment. There were 27 teams competing this season, split in 2 groups. The winners of the groups played the league's final against each other and also gained promotion to the 2019-20 Kategoria e Parë. The runners-up qualified to the play-off round which they played against the 9th ranked teams in the 2018-19 Kategoria e Parë. Devolli and Tërbuni were promoted to the 2019-20 Kategoria e Parë. Tërbuni won their fourth Kategoria e Dytë title after beating Devolli in the final match.

Changes from last season

Team changes

From Kategoria e Dytë
Promoted to Kategoria e Parë:
 Elbasani
 Oriku
 Veleçiku
 Vora

Relegated to Kategoria e Tretë:
 Domozdova

To Kategoria e Dytë
Relegated from Kategoria e Parë:
 Naftëtari
 Shkumbini
 Tërbuni
 Vllaznia B

Promoted from Kategoria e Tretë:
 Term

Locations

Stadia by capacity and locations

Group A

Group B

Source:

League standings

Group A

Group B

Final

References

3
2018–19 in European third tier association football leagues
Kategoria e Dytë seasons